Werner Zschiesche (6 April 1903 – 5 August 1974) was a German rower. He competed in the men's coxless four event at the 1928 Summer Olympics.

References

1903 births
1974 deaths
Rowers from Dresden
People from the Kingdom of Saxony
German male rowers
Olympic rowers of Germany
Rowers at the 1928 Summer Olympics